Ahmet Kandemir (born June 20, 1970) is a Turkish professional basketball coach. He is currently the head coach of the Kosovo Basketball Superleague club Sigal Prishtina.

References

1970 births
Living people
Antalya Büyükşehir Belediyesi coaches
Basketbol Süper Ligi head coaches
Beşiktaş basketball coaches
Karşıyaka basketball coaches
KB Prishtina coaches
Turkish basketball coaches
People from Sinop, Turkey